Kenwyn is a settlement and civil parish in Cornwall, England. The settlement is a suburb of the city of Truro and lies 0.5 mi (1 km) north of the city centre, within Truro parish, whereas Kenwyn parish covers an area west and north-west of the city. Kenwyn gives its name to one of three rivers that flow through the city.

The civil parish includes the villages of Threemilestone and Shortlanesend, and several hamlets including Allet, Greenbottom and Idless. The population of the parish at the 2011 census was 5,800.

History and toponymy
It is likely that the church of Kenwyn was the mother church of Truro. The original dedication is possibly St Keyne; Keynwen is the earliest form of the name, which would be 'Keyn' and -wen' (white/blessed). By the 15th century, it was assumed to be St. Kenwyn, though no medieval records record it with the prefix 'Saint'. Subsequently, the dedication was attributed to St. Cuby.

The manor of Kenwyn was held in the 12th century by Richard de Luci, after it had been confiscated by the King. Apparently, the borough of Truro was established by the lord in part of the manor and this was the beginning of Truro as a town, then called Triuereu. In the Domesday Book the manor of Kenwyn appears as Tregavran (in later usage Trehaverne). It was in the possession of the families of Lantyan, Beville, Grenville, and Enys, for many centuries.

The earliest form of the name is Keynwen (1259), which comes from the Cornish words keyn "ridge" and gwynn "white". The modern Cornish form is spelled Keynwynn.

Arthur Langdon (1896) describes a Cornish cross in the manor house grounds at Eastbourne, Sussex, which was originally at Kenwyn. Davies Gilbert, a former resident of the manor house, removed it from a roadside gate west of Truro where it was in use as a gatepost and had it transported to Eastbourne in 1817. The shaft is ornamented on all four sides.

Notable buildings

Kenwyn parish church dates to the 14th or 15th century, with the south aisle and tower dating to the 15th century. Restorations from 1820 to 1862 have reduced the interior to its present state. There is a peal of eight bells. The churchyard provides a fine view over the city of Truro and above the lychgate is an upper chamber (probably a schoolroom). On 24 March 2007, during a service at the church to mark the 200th anniversary of the parliamentary abolition of the slave trade throughout the British Empire, the life of Joseph Antonio Emidy was featured and some typical pieces of music from his time were played in tribute.

Lis Escop (the Kenwyn vicarage of 1780) became after the establishment of the Diocese of Truro the bishop's palace. For some years it housed part of Truro Cathedral School, which closed in 1981. It then housed the Community of the Epiphany (Anglican nuns) and is now, as Epiphany House, a Christian retreat and conference centre.

The Kenwyn building at Truro College is named after the River Kenwyn.

Notable residents 

Paul Robins (1804-1890), a Bible Christian pioneer in Canada
Joseph Antonio Emidy (1775-1835), composer and former slave, is buried here
Charles Foster Barham (1804-1884), physician and antiquarian, is buried here
Edward Harold Browne (1811-1891), Bishop of Winchester, was Vicar of Kenwyn from 1849 to 1857
John Rundle Cornish (1837-1918), Bishop of St Germans, was Vicar of Kenwyn
Conrad Meyer (1922-2011), Bishop of Dorchester, was Vicar of Kenwyn

References

External links

Villages in Cornwall
Civil parishes in Cornwall
Truro
Manors in Cornwall